Greatest Hits/Live is a compilation album of greatest hits, live recordings and new tracks by American rock band Heart, released on November 29, 1980, by Epic Records. The album was issued in North America as a double LP. The first disc is a collection of the band's greatest hits, while the second is mostly a live album, although it contains three previously unreleased studio recordings, including a cover of "Tell It Like It Is", released as the first single. The second single released from the album was a live cover of "Unchained Melody".

The songs "Hit Single", "Strange Euphoria", and "Unchained Melody" were omitted from the CD version of the album, due to initial limitations in CD technology. "Unchained Melody" would later resurface on several compilations, while "Hit Single" and "Strange Euphoria" would only become available on the limited three-disc edition of The Essential Heart in 2009. "Strange Euphoria" also appears on the 2012 box set of the same name.

Greatest Hits/Live reached number 13 on the US Billboard 200 chart and has been certified double platinum by the Recording Industry Association of America (RIAA).

In Europe, the album was released as a single disc with 10 songs. In 1999, Sony Music re-released this version with different artwork under the title Simply the Best, as part of their budget series of the same name.

Track listing

European edition (Simply the Best)

Personnel
Credits adapted from the liner notes of Greatest Hits/Live.

Heart
 Howard Leese
 Steve Fossen
 Ann Wilson
 Michael DeRosier
 Nancy Wilson

Additional musicians
 Lenny Pickett, Greg Adams, Emilio Castillo, Steven Kupka, Mic Gillette – horns

Technical
 Heart – production 
 Mike Flicker – production ; engineering 
 Connie – production 
 Howie – production 
 Rob Perkins – engineering 
 Brian Foraker – engineering 
 Mike Beiriger – engineering 
 John Golden – mastering

Artwork
 Neal Preston – front and back cover photography

Charts

Weekly charts

Year-end charts

Certifications

Notes

References

1980 greatest hits albums
1980 live albums
Albums produced by Mike Flicker
Epic Records compilation albums
Epic Records live albums
Heart (band) compilation albums
Heart (band) live albums